Norodom (born Ang Voddey; 3 February 1834 – 24 April 1904) was King of Cambodia from 19 October 1860 to his death on 24 April 1904. He was the eldest son of King Ang Duong and was a half-brother of Prince Si Votha and King Sisowath. He was elected to the throne in 1860 but would not be crowned until 1864 due to the fact that Siam held the royal regalia (the royal crown and other artefacts). In 1863, he signed a treaty with France by which he gave France control over Cambodia's foreign relations in exchange for personal protection against his enemies. The treaty saved Cambodian independence, but French control over Cambodia's internal affairs strengthened continually until the end of his reign (full independence was not restored until 1953). Upon his death, he was succeeded by his half-brother, Sisowath.

He is the progenitor of the House of Norodom which has been the ruling royal house of Cambodia since 1941.

Name

Norodom's royal name was Norodom Prohmbarirak, previously, Ang Reacheavoddey. He is referred to as Ang Voddey in some Western accounts. His posthumous title is Preah Karuna Preah Sovannakot.

Rule

Background: Cambodia from Ang Eng to Ang Duong
King Norodom's grandfather, King Ang Eng, died in early 1797. He left four sons, of whom the eldest, Ang Chan, became king, but as Chan was a minor on his father's death his coronation was delayed until 1806, when he turned 16. Chan quarreled with his overlord the king of Siam (Thailand) and with his brothers, and the remainder of his reign was filled with wars between Chan's new overlord, the emperor of Vietnam, and the Thais, fought largely in the territory of Cambodia. Chan died in 1834, but the wars continued until 1847 when they ended with a peace treaty between Siam and Vietnam under which Chan's youngest brother, Ang Duong, was recognised as king. (The other two brothers were dead by this time). Ang Duong's reign, from 1848 (the year of his coronation, although his reign began in 1847 and he had claimed the throne even earlier) until his death in 1860 did much to restore the country, which had suffered much in the previous three decades.

Early life and accession
 

Norodom was the eldest son of Ang Duong. In 1850, he and his half-brother Prince Sisowath were sent to study in Bangkok by their father Ang Duong, where they grew up in close proximity to members of the Siamese royal family. In 1857, Norodom (Prince Phrom Borirak) served in the Royal Siamese Army as a military adviser, for which later he was awarded the Order of the White Elephant.

In 1861, Norodom's half-brother Si Votha rebelled and Norodom abandoned the capital of Oudong and fled to safety in Bangkok. The Siamese court returned him to Phnom Penh early in 1862, and in 1863 he signed a treaty with the French placing himself under French protection. The Siamese eventually returned the royal regalia and his coronation followed in 1864.

French protectorate

On 17 June 1884, French authorities forced King Norodom to sign a treaty which consolidated their position in Cambodia by forcing him to give up control of public revenue, customs taxes and public works. Norodom resisted but with French gunboats anchored outside the Royal Palace he had no choice but to sign. The French actions caused widespread anger throughout the country. In 1885 Prince Si Votha, Norodom's half brother, led a revolt against the French rule. The French suspected that Norodom was secretly supporting Si Votha's actions and blamed him for inciting the revolts. The revolt ended when the Cambodians were assured by King Norodom that the French had offered concessions to him. After the restoration of the 1885-1886 revolt, Norodom was in a position of temporary strength. To prevent another revolt, the French were less inclined to force the king to the wall once more.

After the 1897 coup d'etat against his person, he lost confidence in his closest collaborators namely Thiounn and Bernard Col de Monteiro who were appointed as Ministers without his consent.

Following the Sino-French War (1884–1885), French Indochina was formed in October 1887 from Annam, Tonkin, Cochinchina (who together form modern Vietnam) and the Kingdom of Cambodia.

For the remainder of his rule, Norodom was a puppet of the French. Before he died in 1904, he appointed his son, Prince Norodom, as heir apparent to the throne. But Yukanthor had a fall-out with the French and did not succeed to the throne. Norodom died in the palace in Phnom Penh in April 1904; his body was cremated in the traditional Buddhist fashion in 1906. He was succeeded by his half-brother Sisowath.

Reforms

Throughout Norodom's reign, several administrative and judicial reforms were improved in the kingdom. The reduction of provinces was imposed to help reduce administrative costs. He also followed King Chulalongkorn and abolished commercial monopolies, slavery, and civil lists for the royal family. During his reign, certain agricultural products such as betel, pepper and sugar costs were reduced.

Legacy

King Norodom was remembered for his appreciation and fondness of the arts. It was under his supervision that the Silver Pagoda was built in 1892, as well as Wat Oudong consecrated on 6 June 1875. When Norodom assumed the throne in 1860, classical dance recovered some of its ancient prestige, and soon became a great honour for court officials, ministers and senior dignitaries to have their children admitted to the palace's school of dancing.

In 1872, Norodom went on an official visit to Hong Kong, Manila and Singapore. In Manila, the King was greatly impressed by the music skills of the Filipinos and decided to take some musicians back to Cambodia to teach modern music. Norodom's generosity began drawing artists from many nationalities to Cambodia and they were always given a warm welcome at royal palace and court. Most of them had a deep interest in the Royal Ballet and thus were given every opportunity to learn Khmer music and dance.

Under King Norodom, the beginnings of the Royal Khmer Navy were established for territorial protection.

Honours
  Grand Croix of the Légion d'honneur-1872 (Grand Officier-1869) (Chevalier-1865) (France)

References

 
 Encyclopædia Britannica.com
 Milton E. Osborne, The French Presence in Cochinchina and Cambodia

1834 births
1904 deaths
Cambodian Buddhists
Cambodian Theravada Buddhists
Cambodian Buddhist monarchs
People from Takéo province
19th-century Cambodian monarchs
Cambodian people of Thai descent
Grand Croix of the Légion d'honneur
House of Norodom
20th-century Cambodian monarchs